Ultra-Warrior is a 1981 board game published by Task Force Games.

Gameplay
Ultra-Warrior is a game of man-to-man combat in a far future in which armies have been replaced by single combatants protected by environmental control suits and energy barriers, wielding weapons capable of changing the very landscape upon which their opponents stand.

Reception
William A. Barton reviewed Ultra-Warrior in The Space Gamer No. 44. Barton commented that "Overall, Ultra-Warrior isn't a bad little game. Unless the idea of knights-errant jousting across the cosmos turns you off, you might find it a worthy selection for a quick play session with a moderate-level simulation."

Tony Watson reviewed Ultra-Warrior in Ares Magazine #13 and commented that "the game plays fairly well, the rules are concise, and the physical qualify is up to Task Force's usual good standards. Rather than being a bad game, Ultra-Warrior is something of a bland game, whose features wear thin after only a few playings."

References

Board games introduced in 1981
Task Force Games games